Forney is an unincorporated community in Cherokee County, Alabama, United States.

History
A post office called Forney was established in 1878, and remained in operation until 1936. The community was named for P. Forney, who kept a store there.

References

Unincorporated communities in Cherokee County, Alabama
Unincorporated communities in Alabama